Into Cold Darkness is the second album by Vital Remains. It was released in 1995 by Peaceville Records, and re-issued in 2003 with two bonus tracks as a digipak. The last to feature lead guitarist Paul Flynn and vocalist Jeff Gruslin and the only album to feature drummer Rick Corbett.

Track listing

Personnel
Paul Flynn – lead guitar
Tony Lazaro – rhythm guitar
Jeff Gruslin – vocals
Joe Lewis – bass
Rick Corbett – drums

1995 albums
Vital Remains albums